The Society for Promoting Igbo Language and Culture (SPILC) was founded in 1949 by Frederick Chidozie Ogbalu for the promotion of the Igbo language and culture, and has since created a standard dialect for Igbo.

References

Igbo language
Organizations established in 1949
Language regulators